Eduardo Montagner Anguiano is a Chipilo Venetian writer, born in Chipilo, Puebla, Mexico, in an Italian immigrant family. He studied linguistics and Spanish Language (Letras hispánicas) at Puebla Autonomous University. He is a translator, poet, novelist and protector  of minority languages in Mexico, principally a Chipileño language.

Biography
He was born in Chipilo (San Gregorio Atzompa Municipality), on May 12, 1975. He is a grandson of Venetian immigrants from Segusino, Italy, who arrived to Mexico in 1882 and founded a farm colony named Chipilo de Francisco Xavier Mina, near Puebla City. He spoke a Venetian language since his childhood with Spanish language.

He studied linguistics and Spanish Language at Puebla Autonomous University, was the first academic contact as writer and poet.

Books 
Parlar par véneto, víver a Mésico (2005, Conaculta).
Al prim (2006, Conaculta/Secretaría de Cultura de Puebla).
Toda esa gran verdad (2006, Alfaguara / 2008, Punto de Lectura).
Ancora fon ora (2010, Conaculta/Secretaría de Cultura de Puebla).

Awards
 2005, Concorso Letterario Internazionale in Lingua Veneta Mario Donadoni.

See also 
 Italian Mexicans

References

1975 births
Venetian language
Living people
People from Puebla
Mexican male writers
Mexican male novelists
Mexican translators
Mexican people of Italian descent